Events in the year 1902 in Portugal.

Incumbents
 Monarch: Carlos I
 President of the Council of Ministers: Ernesto Hintze Ribeiro

Events
 Bailundo Revolt of 1902

Sport
 Establishment of the Club Internacional de Foot-ball

References

 
Portugal
Years of the 20th century in Portugal
Portugal